Ji Yi-soo is a South Korean actress and model. She is best known for her roles in dramas such as Woman with a Suitcase, Solomon's Perjury and When the Camellia Blooms.

Biography and career
She was born on October 26 in 1991 in Jeolla. She joined Pan Star Company as model and she made her debut as an actress in 2015 in drama Unkind Women on KBS2. She was noted for her performance in drama Dear My Friends as Sang-sook. She then appeared in several more dramas such as The Doctors, Solomon's Perjury and When the Camellia Blooms. She also appeared in movies such as Cheer Up, Mr. Lee and Diva.

Filmography

Television series

Film

References

External links 
 
 

1991 births
Living people
21st-century South Korean actresses
South Korean female models
South Korean television actresses
South Korean film actresses